Juan Echanove Labanda (born 1 April 1961, in Madrid) is a Spanish actor.

At Gijón International Film Festival in 2002, he received the Nacho Martínez Award.

Selected filmography
Manolete (Menno Meyjes, 2008)
Alatriste (Agustín Díaz Yanes, 2005).
Bienvenido a casa (David Trueba, 2005)
Morir en San Hilario (Laura Mañà, 2005).
Los Reyes Magos - voz - (Antonio Navarro, 2003).
Sin noticias de Dios (Agustín Díaz Yanes,2001)
Adiós con el corazón (José Luis García Sánchez, 2000).
Los años bárbaros (Fernando Colomo, 1998)
Sus ojos se cerraron (Jaime Chávarri, 1997)
Siempre hay un camino a la derecha (José Luis García Sánchez, 1997).
Memorias del ángel caído (David Alonso, 1995)
Suspiros de España (José Luis García Sánchez, 1997).
La flor de mi secreto (Pedro Almodóvar, 1995)
MadreGilda (Francisco Reguiero, 1993).
Mi hermano del alma (Manolo Barroso, 1993).
Historias de la puta Mili (Xavier Bárbara, 1993).
Orquesta Club Virginia (Manuel Iborra, 1992)
A solas contigo (Eduardo Campoy, 1990).
El vuelo de la paloma (José Luis García Sánchez, 1987)
Miss Caribe (José Luis García Sánchez, 1989).
Divinas palabras (José Luis García Sánchez, 1987).
Bajarse al moro (Fernando Colomo, 1988).
Tiempo de silencio (Vicente Aranda, 1986).
La noche más hermosa (Manuel Gutiérrez Aragón, 1986)

Theatre
As director
Visitando al Señor Green (2005)

As actor
El precio (2003), by  Arthur Miller.
Cómo canta una ciudad de noviembre a noviembre  (2003).
El verdugo (2000), based on the film by Luis García Berlanga.
El cerdo (1993).

Television
 Desaparecidos (2020–)
 El Cid (2020)
Un paso adelante (2003).
 La vida de Rita (2003).
Cuéntame cómo pasó (2001, 2005 - 2017).
Hermanos de leche (1994).
Chicas de hoy en día (Fernando Colomo, 1991)
Vísperas (1987)
Turno de oficio (1986–1987)

Discography
Mucho más que dos (1993)

References

External links
web site of Juan Echanove

1961 births
Living people
Male actors from Madrid
Best Actor Goya Award winners
Spanish male stage actors
Spanish male television actors
Spanish male film actors
Best Supporting Actor Goya Award winners
20th-century Spanish male actors
21st-century Spanish male actors